The United States secretary of homeland security is the head of the United States Department of Homeland Security, the federal department tasked with ensuring public safety in the United States. The secretary is a member of the Cabinet of the United States. The position was created by the Homeland Security Act following the attacks of September 11, 2001.

The new department consisted primarily of components transferred from other Cabinet departments because of their role in homeland security, such as the Coast Guard, the Federal Protective Service, U.S. Customs and Border Protection (which includes the United States Border Patrol), U.S. Immigration and Customs Enforcement (which includes Homeland Security Investigations), the United States Secret Service and the Federal Emergency Management Agency. It does not, however, include the Federal Bureau of Investigation or the U.S. Marshals Service. They continue to operate under U.S. Department of Justice.

The current secretary of homeland security is Alejandro Mayorkas, since February 2, 2021. He is the first Latino and immigrant to lead the Department of Homeland Security.

List of secretaries of homeland security
Prior to the establishment of the U.S. Department of Homeland Security, there existed an assistant to the president for the Office of Homeland Security, which was created following the September 11 attacks in 2001.

Parties
 (5)
 (3)
 (4)

Status

a.  James Loy served as acting secretary in his capacity as Deputy Secretary of Homeland Security.

b.  Rand Beers served as acting secretary in his capacity as confirmed Undersecretary of Homeland Security for National Protection and Programs and Acting Deputy Secretary of Homeland Security; Beers was the highest ranking Senate-approved presidential appointee at the Department of Homeland Security.

c.  Elaine Duke served as acting secretary in her capacity as Deputy Secretary of Homeland Security.

d.  Kevin McAleenan served as acting secretary in his capacity as Commissioner of Customs and Border Protection. His tenure was ruled unlawful.

e.  Chad Wolf served as acting secretary in his capacity as Under Secretary of Homeland Security for Strategy, Policy, and Plans. His tenure was ruled unlawful.

f.  Peter Gaynor served as acting secretary in his capacity as Federal Emergency Management Agency Administrator.

g.  David Pekoske served as acting secretary in his capacity as Administrator of the Transportation Security Administration

Order of succession
While appointment of acting officials is generally governed by the Federal Vacancies Reform Act of 1998 (FVRA), the Homeland Security Act of 2002 creates exceptions to FVRA, mandating that the under secretary of homeland security for management is third in the line of succession for Secretary of Homeland Security, and establishes an alternate process by which the secretary can directly establish a line of succession outside the provisions of the FVRA.

As of November 8, 2019, the order of succession is as follows.  However, the legality of this update was challenged.

 Deputy Secretary of Homeland Security
 Under Secretary for Management
 Commissioner of the U.S. Customs and Border Protection
 Under Secretary for Strategy, Policy, and Plans
 Administrator and Assistant Secretary of the Transportation Security Administration
 Administrator of the Federal Emergency Management Agency

Formerly, an April 10, 2019 update to the DHS Orders of Succession, made pursuant to the Homeland Security Act of 2002, provided a different order in the case of unavailability to act during a disaster or catastrophic emergency:

 Deputy Secretary of Homeland Security 
 Under Secretary for Management 
 Commissioner of U.S. Customs and Border Protection 
 Administrator of the Federal Emergency Management Agency 
 Director of the Cybersecurity and Infrastructure Security Agency 
 Under Secretary for Science and Technology 
 Under Secretary for Intelligence and Analysis 
 Administrator of the Transportation Security Administration 
 Director of U.S. Immigration and Customs Enforcement 
 Director of U.S. Citizenship and Immigration Services 
 Under Secretary for Strategy, Policy, and Plans 
 General Counsel 
 Deputy Under Secretary for Management
 Deputy Commissioner of U.S. Customs and Border Protection 
 Deputy Administrator of the Transportation Security Administration 
 Deputy Director of U.S. Immigration and Customs Enforcement 
 Deputy Director of U.S. Citizenship and Immigration Services 
 Director of the Federal Law Enforcement Training Centers

As a result of Executive Order 13753 in 2016, the order of succession for the secretary of homeland security was as follows:

 Deputy Secretary of Homeland Security
 Under Secretary of Homeland Security for Management
 Administrator of the Federal Emergency Management Agency
Under Secretary of Homeland Security for National Protection and Programs
Under Secretary of Homeland Security for Science and Technology
Under Secretary for Intelligence and Analysis
Commissioner of U.S. Customs and Border Protection
Administrator of the Transportation Security Administration
Director of U.S. Immigration and Customs Enforcement
Director of U.S. Citizenship and Immigration Services
Assistant Secretary for Policy
General Counsel of the Department of Homeland Security
Deputy Under Secretary for Management
Deputy Commissioner of U.S. Customs and Border Protection
Deputy Administrator of the Transportation Security Administration
Deputy Director of U.S. Immigration and Customs Enforcement
Deputy Director of U.S. Citizenship and Immigration Services
Director of the Federal Law Enforcement Training Center

Administration-cited potential nominees

Bernard Kerik
George W. Bush nominated Bernard Kerik for the position in 2004. However a week later, Kerik withdrew his nomination, explaining that he had employed an illegal immigrant as a nanny.

Raymond Kelly
By July 2013, Raymond Kelly had served as Commissioner of the New York City Police Department (NYPD) for nearly 12 straight years. Within days of Homeland Security secretary Janet Napolitano's announcement that she was resigning, Kelly was soon cited as an obvious potential successor by New York senator Charles Schumer and others.

During a July 16, 2013, interview, President Obama referred generally to the "bunch of strong candidates" for nomination to head the Department of Homeland Security, but singled out Kelly as "one of the best there is" and "very well qualified for the job".

Later in July 2013, the online internet news website/magazine Huffington Post detailed "a growing campaign to quash the potential nomination of New York City Police commissioner Raymond Kelly as the next secretary of the Department of Homeland Security" amid claims of "divisive, harmful, and ineffective policing that promotes stereotypes and profiling". Days after that article, Kelly penned a statistics-heavy Wall Street Journal opinion article defending the NYPD's programs, stating "the average number of stops we conduct is less than one per officer per week" and that this and other practices have led to "7,383 lives saved—and... they are largely the lives of young men of color."

Kelly was also featured because of his NYPD retirement and unusually long tenure there in a long segment on the CBS News program Sunday Morning in December 2013, especially raising the question of the controversial "stop and frisk" policy in New York City and the long decline and drop of various types of crimes committed.

See also
 Interior minister
 List of current interior ministers

References

External links 
 

|-

Homeland Security
Interior ministers
Homeland Security